Ettore Manni (6 May 1927 – 27 July 1979) was an Italian film actor. He appeared in more than 100 films between 1952 and 1979.

Life and career
Born in Rome, Manni debuted as an actor in 1952, when in spite of his acting inexperience he was chosen by Luigi Comencini for the main role in La tratta delle bianche. Following the success of the film Manni interrupted his university studies and started appearing in a significant number of films of any genre, becoming in a short time one of the most popular actors in the Italian cinema. As his fame declined in the 1960s, Manni appeared mainly in Spaghetti Western and peplum films, but he also took part in several international productions, including films by Delmer Daves and Tony Richardson. His last role was Katzone in Federico Fellini's City of Women.

He died in Rome, aged 52, after accidentally shooting himself.

Filmography

 Girls Marked Danger (1952) - Carlo Sozzosi
 I tre corsari (1952) - Il Corsaro Nero - Enrico di Ventimiglia
 Brothers of Italy (1952) - Il capitano Nazario Sauro
 Fatal Desire (1953) - Turiddu
 La lupa (1953) - Nanni Lasca
 The Ship of Condemned Women (1953) - Da Silva
 Two Nights with Cleopatra (1954) - Marcantonio
 Attila (1954) - Bleda, brother of Attila
 Human Torpedoes (1954) - Marco
 Bella non piangere (1955) - Enrico Toti
 Le Amiche (1955) - Carlo
  (1955) - Marco Vetti
 Folgore Division (1955) - Captain Martini
  (1955) - Glauco
 A Woman Alone (1956) - Giulio, il giornalista
 Poveri ma belli (1957) - Ugo
 Dimentica il mio passato (1957) - Juan
 Addio sogni di gloria (1957) - Marcello Roveda
 Il ricatto di un padre (1957) - Ingegner Paolo Mari
 Susanna tutta panna (1957) - (uncredited)
  (1957) - Luigi
  (1958) - Salvatore Improta
 Ladro lui, ladra lei (1958) - Raimondi
 Giovane canaglia (1958) - Marco
 The Warrior and the Slave Girl (1958) - Marco Numidio
 Pirate of the Black Hawk (1958) - Giovanni
 Addio per sempre! (1958) - Salvatore Improta
 Ten Ready Rifles (1959) - Miguel
 Buen viaje, Pablo (1959) - Pablo
 Legions of the Nile (1959) - Curridio
 Austerlitz (1960) - Lucien Bonaparte
 Cleopatra's Daughter (1960) - Resi - Pharaoh's Physician
 The Revolt of the Slaves (1960) - San Sebastiano
 Behind Closed Doors (1961) - Il marinaio
 Amazons of Rome (1961) - Horatio / Cocles, Roman Consul
 Hercules and the Conquest of Atlantis (1961) - Androclo, King of Thebes
 Ursus and the Tartar Princess (1961) - Prince Stefan
 The Valiant (1962) - Luigi Durand de la Penne
 Samson Against the Sheik (1962)
 Lo sceicco rosso (1962) - Mohammad
 Attack of the Normans (1962) - Olivier D'Anglon
 Quattro notti con Alba (1962) - Sergeant Morettini
 The Shortest Day (1963) - Ettore (uncredited)
 Gold for the Caesars (1963) - Luna the Celt
 La pupa (1963) - Gianni
 Hercules and the Masked Rider (1963) - Captain Blasco
 Rome Against Rome (1964) - Gaius
 Mission to Venice (1964) - Giuseppe
 Hercules, Prisoner of Evil (1964) - Ilo
 Giants of Rome (1964) - Castor
 The Battle of the Villa Fiorita (1965) - Father Rossi
 Mademoiselle (1966) - Manou
 Johnny Oro (1966) - Sheriff Bill Norton
 Starblack (1966)
 The Devil in Love (1966) - Capitano Gianfigliazzo - The Guard Captain
 For a Few Extra Dollars (1966)
 Sept hommes et une garce (1967) - Le capitaine autrichien
 The Strange Night (1967) - I'ufficiale
 The Stranger Returns (1967) - Lt. George Stafford
 Untamable Angelique (1967) - Jason
 Straniero... fatti il segno della croce! (1968) - Blake Logan
 Angelique and the Sultan (1968) - Jason
 All'ultimo sangue (1968) - El Chaleco
 Bury Them Deep (1968) - Jonathan Clay
 The Battle of El Alamein (1969) - Italian Captain
 Sartana the Gravedigger (1969) - Baxter Red
 Les belles au bois dormantes (1970) - Le docteur Henri Delmas
 La salamandra del deserto (1970)
 Django and Sartana Are Coming... It's the End (1970) - Sheriff
 Dead Men Don't Make Shadows (1970) - Barrett, former Billy Ring
 Bali (1970) -  Police Commissioner
 Mazzabubù... quante corna stanno quaggiù? (1971) - Il medico fecondatore
 That's How We Women Are (1971) - Teresa's Husband (segment "Schiava d'amore")
 Karzan, il favoloso uomo della jungla (1972) - Captain Fox
 A.A.A. Massaggiatrice bella presenza offresi... (1972) - Police Commissioner
 Amico mio, frega tu... che frego io! (1973) - Jonas Dickinson
 Super Bitch (1973) - Morell
 Tony Arzenta (1973) - Gesmundo - the sauna owner
 Li chiamavano i tre moschettieri... invece erano quattro (1973) - Porthos
 Chino (1973) - Sheriff
 Anna, quel particolare piacere (1973) - Zuco
 Buona parte di Paolina (1973) - Il brigante
 Young Lucrezia (1974) - Rodrigo Borgia - Papa Alessandro VI
 Drama of the Rich (1974) - Il dottore Carlo Secchi
 Heroes in Hell (1974) - Bakara
 Rabid Dogs (1974) - Bank President
 Furia nera (1975)
 Calling All Police Cars (1975) - Enrico Tummoli
 The Divine Nymph (1975) - Il professore Marco Pisani
 Eye of the Cat (1975) - Un amico di cesare
 La peccatrice (1975) - Santuzzo
 La madama (1976) - Sante Tonnaro
 Street People (1976) - Il padre Frank
 Crimebusters (1976) - Lawyer Vieri
 Meet Him and Die (1976) - Perrone
 Oh, Serafina! (1976) - Padre di Serafina
 The Rip-off (1977) - Ettore
 La malavita attacca... la polizia risponde! (1977) - Rampelli
 In the Name of the Pope King (1977) - Il conte Ottavio
 Silver Saddle (1978) - Thomas Barrett
 Il commissario di ferro (1978) - Ingravallo
 A Man on His Knees (1979) - Vincenzo Fabbricante
 Hypochondriac (1979) - Amministratore dei poderi
 La verdad sobre el caso Savolta (1980) - Claudedeu
 City of Women (1980) - Dr. Xavier Katzone

References

External links

1927 births
1979 deaths
Deaths by firearm in Italy
Firearm accident victims
Italian male film actors
Accidental deaths in Italy
Male actors from Rome
20th-century Italian male actors
People of Lazian descent